Rosendahl may refer to:
 Rosendahl, a municipality in the district of Coesfeld in the state of North Rhine-Westphalia, Germany
 Rosendahl Design Group, a company
 Rosendahl bend (a.k.a. Zeppelin bend), a general purpose bend knot

People 
 Andreas Rosendahl (1864–1909), Danish chess master
 Ann-Janeth Rosendahl (living, born 1959), Swedish cross country skier who competed in the early 1980s
 Bill Rosendahl (1945–2016), American politician
 Björn Rosendahl (living), Swedish orienteering competitor
 Carl Otto Rosendahl (1875–1956), botanist (author abbreviation Rosend.)
 Charles E. Rosendahl (1892–1977), decorated Vice Admiral in the United States Navy
 Eric Rosendahl (born 1950s), Canadian politician
 Hans Rosendahl (1944–2021), Swedish former swimmer
 Heide Rosendahl (born 1947), retired German athlete
 Henrik Viktor Rosendahl (1855–1918), Swedish physician, pharmacologist, and botanist (author abbreviation H.Rosend.)
 Ilja Rosendahl (born 1968), German film and music producer, actor, songwriter and musician
 Katri Rosendahl (born 1984), Finnish endurance rider
 Ola Rosendahl (1939–2008), Finnish agronomist, farmer and politician
 Pernille Rosendahl (born 1972), Danish singer
 Philip R. Rosendahl (1893–1974), acting governor of the Danish colony of North Greenland from 1925 to 1928
 Saskia Rosendahl (born 1993), German actress
 Sven Rosendahl (1913–1990), Swedish journalist, novelist and short story writer

See also 
 Rosendaël, a former commune in the Nord department in northern France
 Roosendaal, a city and a municipality in the province of North Brabant in southern Netherlands
 Rosenthal (disambiguation)

Jewish surnames